Adnan Herco is a Bosnian volleyball player.
He was born in Sarajevo,  in Bosnia and Herzegovina. He played for Habo Wolley in the Swedish volleyball championship  and is one of the club's best-known players. He was the  highest point scorer in the Swedish Volleyball League Svenska Volleybollförbundet in the 2010-2011 and 2011-2012 season.
He is 195 cm and plays as a spiker.

Playing for OK Kakanj, Bosnia's most successful volleyball club, he was a member of the Premier League of Volleyball of Bosnia and Herzegovina national championship winning team 5 times (2000, 2001, 2003, 2004, 2005) and the National Cup of Bosnia and Herzegovina winning team on 4 occasions (2001, 2002, 2003, 2004, 2006). At OK Kakanj, he played as passer-side attacker.

He has made 3 international appearances for the Bosnia and Herzegovina national volleyball team.

Clubs

https://www.jnytt.se/article/adnan-herco-nara-att-sluta-nu-laddar-han-om/

References
https://www.jnytt.se/article/adnan-herco-nara-att-sluta-nu-laddar-han-om/

Living people
1982 births
Sportspeople from Sarajevo
Bosnia and Herzegovina men's volleyball players
Bosniaks of Bosnia and Herzegovina